The Department of Economic Development, Tourism and the Arts (DEDTA) was the Tasmanian Government Department responsible for leading economic and industry development in Tasmania.
They were the first point of contact for companies wishing to establish, relocate, diversify or expand in Tasmania.  They also act as a conduit to other state and Australian Government departments, local government and Tasmanian business.  They also linked government and the private sector in marketing Tasmania's unique assets.  DEDTA was merged with DIER to form the new Department of State Growth.

Agencies
The Department of Economic Development, Tourism and the Arts was composed of several agencies, each with a unique focus on the Tasmanian community:
Economic Development
Arts and Culture
Tourism
Innovation, Science and Technology
Sport and Recreation

References

External links
 Official site

See also
Arts Tasmania
Economy of Tasmania
Sport in Tasmania
List of events in Tasmania
Tourism Tasmania

Economy of Tasmania
Defunct Government departments of Tasmania